Garmekan or Garamig was an early Sasanian province located in northern Mesopotamia, between the Little Zab and Diyala river. Its capital was Karka d-Beth Slokh. The province is omitted in Shapur I's list of provinces in the Ka'ba-ye Zartosht inscription, which indicates that it was part of Nodshiragan during that period. Garmekan is first attested as a Sasanian province in the Paikuli inscription of Narseh in 293/4, who describes how the aristocracy of Asoristan, Garmekan, and Shahrazur met him at Hayan i Nikatra in order to convince him to the become the new king. Before the Council of Seleucia-Ctesiphon in 410, Garmekan had been merged with the province of Nodshiragan, becoming known as Garamig ud Nodardashiragan.

References

Sources 
 
 
 
 

Provinces of the Sasanian Empire
290s establishments